The Rare Barrel is a brewery and brewpub in Berkeley, California, United States, that exclusively produces sour beers.

History
Founders Jay Goodwin and Alex Wallash met while attending UCSB. They started home-brewing in their apartment and decided that they would one day start a brewery together. Goodwin started working at The Bruery, where he worked his way from a production assistant to brewer, eventually becoming the head of their barrel aging program.  The Rare Barrel brewed its first batch of beer in February 2013, and opened its tasting room on December 27, 2013.

The Rare Barrel was named for "ph1" a barrel used to make the original batch of La Folie in 2000 by New Belgium Brewing based out of Fort Collins, Colorado. In homage of the original "Rare Barrel", every year the brewery along with its customers and peers select the best barrel of beer and name it "The Rare Barrel" for that year. The "ph1" barrel was gifted to The Rare Barrel by New Belgium in 2015 and as of 2016 is currently active, used to age dark sour beer.

In November 2022, Cellarmaker Brewing Co. acquired The Rare Barrel and plans to reopen the facility late spring next year.

Production

The Rare Barrel only makes sour beers which are aged for an extended period of time in oak barrels; all of their sour beers will age on wood for anywhere from six to 36 months. Their beers are fermented with a combination of Brettanomyces yeast and Lactobacillus and/or Pediococcus bacteria. Lactobacillus and Pediococcus bacteria are both responsible for creating lactic acid and acetic acid, which make the beers acidic and taste sour.

The Rare Barrel currently produces its brews in small-batch quantities, which can range anywhere from one to 10 oak barrels in volume. The brewery's on-site tasting room provides an outlet for showcasing the brewery's single barrel experiments. The Rare Barrel also maintains the Founder's Club program that provides members with exclusive access to some of the brewery's limited releases.

Awards
Several beers from The Rare Barrel have won gold and silver at the Great American Beer Festival and the World Beer Cup.

See also

 California breweries
 Beer in the United States
 Barrel-aged beer

References

Beer brewing companies based in the San Francisco Bay Area
Companies based in Berkeley, California